Jeffrey James Leiding (October 28, 1961 – July 13, 2014) was an American football linebacker who played two seasons with the Indianapolis Colts of the National Football League. He was drafted by the St. Louis Cardinals in the fifth round of the 1984 NFL Draft. He played college football at the University of Texas. Leiding first enrolled at Hickman Mills High School in Kansas City, Missouri  before transferring to Union High School in Tulsa, Oklahoma. He was a consensus All-American in 1983. He was also a member of the San Antonio Gunslingers. He died of a heart attack on July 13, 2014.

References

External links
Just Sports Stats

1961 births
2014 deaths
Players of American football from Kansas City, Missouri
American football linebackers
Texas Longhorns football players
San Antonio Gunslingers players
Indianapolis Colts players
All-American college football players
National Football League replacement players